The following list is a discography of production by Left Brain, an American record producer and rapper, best known as a founding member of hip hop collective Odd Future. It includes a list of songs produced and co-produced by year, artist, album and title.

2008

Odd Future – The Odd Future Tape
 07. "Pimp Slap" (performed by Tyler, The Creator and Hodgy Beats)
 12. "McDonalds" (performed by MellowHype)
 15. "Malaya" (performed by MellowHype)

Dana La Rock – Gold Booms, Silver Bangs: The Fun Tape
 11. "Electrify" (featuring Three-1-Zero)

2009

Hodgy Beats – The Dena Tape
 04. "Rolex"
 09. "Claustroflowbic" (featuring Left Brain)
 18. "The Love"

Mike G – Mike Check
 05. "The Real Talk"
 12. "CocaineKeys" (featuring Casey Veggies)

2010

MellowHype – YelloWhite
 01. "ElephunkCircus"
 02. "SmileMore"
 03. "Team"
 04. "BankRolls"
 05. "Polyurthane"
 Sample credit: Mary Jane Girls - "All Night Long" (1983) 
 06. "Thuggin'"
 07. "CopKiller" (featuring Earl Sweatshirt)
 08. "BlaccFriday" (featuring Mike G and Tyler, The Creator)
 Sample credit: Joe Tex - "Papa Was Too" (1966)
 09. "Premier"
 10. "SmokeSumKushWitMe"
 11. "IntoxicatedDreams"
 12. "Rasta (FreakBass)" (featuring Tyler, The Creator)
 13. "CocainKeys"
 14. "RokRok"
 15. "Rolex"
 16. "Claustroflowbic"

Earl Sweatshirt – Earl
 07. "epaR" (featuring Vince Staples)

Mike G – Ali
 02. "Timeless" (featuring Tyler, The Creator)
 03. "Moracular World" (featuring Vince Staples) (produced with Syd tha Kyd)
 07. "BlaccFriday" (featuring MellowHype and Tyler, The Creator)
 Sample credit: Joe Tex - "Papa Was Too" (1966)
 09. "Crazy"

Domo Genesis – Rolling Papers
 03. "Domier"
 09. "Super Market" (featuring Tyler, The Creator)
 Sample credit: Milton Nascimento - "Canção Do Novo Mundo" (1983)
 12. "Basic Bitch" (featuring MellowHype)

MellowHype – BlackenedWhite
 01. "Primo"
 02. "Gunsounds"
 03. "Brain" (featuring Domo Genesis)
 04. "Loaded" (featuring Mike G)
 05. "Hell" (featuring Frank Ocean)
 Sample credit: Vince Guaraldi Trio - "Christmas Is Coming" (1965)
 Sample credit: Hodgy Beats - "Biscuits" (2009)
 06. "Dead Deputy"
  Sample credit: Styles P - "Dim Da Lights Turn It Up" (2004)
 07. "Right Here"
 Sample credit: Stanley Clarke - "Yesterday Princess" (1974)
 08. "Loco"
 Sample credit: Cortex - "Chanson D'Un Jour D'Hiver" (1975)
 09. "Strip Club"
 10. "Fuck the Police" (featuring Tyler, The Creator)
 11. "Chordaroy" (featuring Earl Sweatshirt and Tyler, The Creator)
 12. "Rico" (featuring Frank Ocean)
 13. "Gram"
 Sample credit: Piero Umiliani - "Nostalgia" (1973)
 14. "Circus"
 15. "Based" (featuring C. Renee)

The Jet Age of Tomorrow – Journey to the 5th Echelon
 07. "The Fallen Angels" (produced with The Super 3)

2011

Domo Genesis – 
 "Heart of Gold" (featuring Tyler, The Creator)

Tyler, The Creator – Goblin
 05. "Transylvania"

Tyler, The Creator – 
 "Thisniggaintfunnyatall" (featuring Jasper Dolphin and Taco)

MellowHype – BlackenedWhite
 01. "Primo"
 02. "Gunsounds"
 03. "Brain" (featuring Domo Genesis)
 04. "64"
 05. "Loaded" (featuring Mike G)
 06. "Dead Deputy"
  Sample credit: Styles P - "Dim Da Lights Turn It Up" (2004)
 07. "Right Here"
 Sample credit: Stanley Clarke - "Yesterday Princess" (1974)
 08. "I Got a Gun"
 09. "F666 the Police" (featuring Tyler, The Creator)
 10. "Rico" (featuring Frank Ocean)
 11. "Circus"
 12. "Gunz"

MellowHype – 
 "Fuckery"
 "Less" (featuring Casey Veggies)

Various – Madden NFL 12 Soundtrack
 19. "On Ya Mind" (performed by MellowHype)

Left Brain – 
 "Glad to Be in Outer Space"
 "Mary Meth"

Odd Future – 12 Odd Future Songs
 02. "67" (performed by MellowHype)
 03. "Forest Green" (performed by Mike G)
 Sample credit: Grieves - "Falling From You" (2011)
 08. "Bank Rolls" (performed by MellowHype)
 12. "Rok Rok" (performed by MellowHype)

Pusha T – Fear of God II: Let Us Pray
 03. "Trouble on My Mind" (featuring Tyler, The Creator) (produced with The Neptunes)
 Sample credit: Tyler, The Creator - "Yonkers" (2011)

Mike G – The Award Tour
 01. "Moracular World" (featuring Vince Staples) (produced with Syd tha Kyd)
 06. "Vicks" (featuring Vince Staples)

Speak! – Inside Out Boy
 01. "Brain Food (whats for dinner)"

The Internet – Purple Naked Ladies
 05. "Cocaine / Tevie" (featuring Left Brain) (produced with The Internet)
 11. "She Knows" (produced with Matt Martians)
 13. "Visions" (featuring Coco O.) (produced with The Internet and Patrick the Great)

2012

MellowHigh – 
 "Lift" (featuring Juicy J)

MellowHype – 
 "45"

Odd Future – The OF Tape Vol. 2
 02. "Bitches" (featuring Hodgy Beats and Domo Genesis)
 Sample credit: Yung Joc - "It's Goin' Down" (2006)
 05. "Forest Green" (featuring Mike G)
 Sample credit: Grieves - "Falling From You" (2011)
 06. "Lean" (featuring Hodgy Beats and Domo Genesis)
 08. "50" (featuring Hodgy Beats and Domo Genesis)
 09. "Snow White" (featuring Hodgy Beats and Frank Ocean)
 10. "Rella" (featuring Domo Genesis, Hodgy Beats and Tyler, The Creator)
 Sample credit: Kanye West - "Dark Fantasy" (2010)
 11. "Real Bitch" (featuring MellowHype and Taco)
 14. "Hcapd" (featuring Domo Genesis, Hodgy Beats and Tyler, The Creator)

Tyler, The Creator – 
 "Sleep"

Children of the Night – Queens... Revisited
 07. "Higher Learning (1:34 AM)" (featuring Marz Lovejoy and Meechy Darko)

MellowHype – MellowHypeWeek
 01. "Decoy"
 02. "Greezy" (featuring Domo Genesis)
 03. "Wasabi" (featuring Juicy J)
 05. "F"
 06. "LP"
 07. "What"

MellowHype – Numbers
 01. "Grill"
 02. "65 / Breakfast"
 03. "Astro" (featuring Frank Ocean) (produced with Hodgy Beats)
 04. "NFWGJDSH"
 05. "La Bonita"
 06. "Beat"
 08. "Untitled L"
 09. "LeFlair"
 10. "Monster"
 11. "666" (featuring Mike G) (produced with Tyler, The Creator)
 12. "P2" (featuring Earl Sweatshirt) (produced with Michael Einziger)
 13. "GNC"
 14. "Brain"
 16. "Break"

2013

Hodgy Beats – Untitled 2
 01. "Sale"
 Sample credit: Psy - "Gangnam Style"(2012)
 02. "Alone"
 03. "Karateman" (featuring Left Brain)
 04. "Bullshittin"
 05. "Years"
 06. "Wicked" (produced with Garrett Stevenson)
 07. "Goodbye" (featuring Lee Spielman) (produced with Garrett Stevenson)

MellowHigh – MellowHigh
 01. "Goon'n"
 02. "Air"
 03. "Yu"
 04. "Extinguisher"
 Sample credit: T La Rock and Jazzy Jay - "It's Yours" (1984)
 05. "Nobody"
 06. "Self Titled"
 07. "Troublesome"
 08. "Get'n Drunk"
 09. "Roofless"
 10. "HighLife" (featuring Currensy and Smoke DZA)
 11. "Cold World" (featuring Remy Banks and Earl Sweatshirt)
 13. "Yu (Remix)" (featuring Tyler, The Creator)

2014

Domo Genesis –
 "Arrival"

MellowHype – INSA
 01. "Gang"
 02. "Bars"
 03. "Dunita"
 04. "I Am A"
 05. "Nowadays"
 06. "Fifa Fo Fum!"
 07. "7"
 08. "Belly"
 Sample credit: Tangerine Dream - "Bent Cold Sidewalk" (1978)
 09. "The Daze"
 10. "Cold World 2"
 11. "DLX"

Domo Genesis – Under the Influence 2
 08. "Follow Me" (featuring Tay Walker)
 10. "Full Moon"
 12. "Sundance Kids" (featuring Hodgy Beats)

2015

Mike G – Award Tour II
 03. "Archer" (featuring Larry Susan)
 Sample credit: Justin Timberlake - "Dress On" (2013)

Hodgy Beats – Dena Tape 2
 12. "Free All My Niggas"

Earl Sweatshirt – I Don't Like Shit, I Don't Go Outside: An Album by Earl Sweatshirt
 05. "Off Top"
 Sample credit: Ann Peebles - "Trouble, Heartaches & Sadness" (1972)

Tree Jay and DJ Clockwork – Baum Blvd
 08. "Higher" (performed by Left Brain)

Remy Banks – Higher
 08. "Rem" (featuring Nasty Nigel)

Mike G – 
 "Fuk It (2009)"
 "A.N.P. (Ain't No Pawty)" (featuring Hodgy Beats)

2016

Mike G – Mike Check Volume II
 11. "Warmup" (featuring Obie Trice)
 15. "KTA"

Domo Genesis – Genesis
 11. "All Night" (featuring King Chip) (produced with Garcia Bros.)

Kitty Cash – Love the Free Vol. III
 16. "LAMN" (featuring MadeinTYO) (produced with Stoney Willis)
 Sample credit: Barbara Mason - "You Better Stop It" (1968)

Pregnant Boy – 1st Trimester
 10. "The Wave" (featuring Doja Cat and Left Brain) (produced with Go Dreamer)

Nasty Nigel – El Utimo Playboy: La Vida Y Los Tiempos De Nigel Rubirosa
 06. "Fin"

MellowHype – 
 "50two"

2017

Left Brain – Mind Gone Volume 1
 02. "LAMN" (featuring MadeinTYO) (produced with Stoney Willis)
 Sample credit: Barbara Mason - "You Better Stop It" (1968)
 03. "Lately" (featuring Santana) (produced with Beat Brigade and SLEEPTVLK)
 04. "2017 I Ain't" (featuring L-Dog and Shann)
 07. "MellowHigh" (featuring Hodgy and Domo Genesis)
 08. "Drug Problems" (featuring Santana)
 13. "In Out" (featuring Fat Nick and Germ)
 15. "Real Friends" (featuring Dro Fe and Les) (produced with Anvil)
 17. "Godess" (featuring Mike G, Shann, Syd, and Hodgy)

Domo Genesis – Red Corolla
 01. "The Red Corolla"

Ash Riser – Ghosts
 07. "Selfish" (featuring Noel Bonham) (produced with Ash Riser)
 10. "Too Cool" (featuring Overdoz)

Secret Circle (Lil Ugly Mane, Antwon and Wiki) –
 "Tonka Truck"

MellowHype –
 "Tisk"

2022

Hodgy - Entitled
 02. People Change
 04. We Never Knew

Upcoming

Mike G – Verses: GT 
 00. "Hypnotize" (featuring Trae tha Truth)

Ash Riser  – H.O.P.E.

References

External links
 
 
 

Production discographies
Discographies of American artists
 
Hip hop discographies